The Nickelodeon Kids' Choice Awards, run annually on United States television since 1988, includes a category for Favorite Male TV Star".

Winners and nominees
The winners are listed in bold.

Most wins
5 wins
Jace Norman (5 consecutive) 
4 wins
Tim Allen (4 consecutive)
Ross Lynch (4 consecutive)
3 wins
Drake Bell (3 consecutive)
Dylan Sprouse (3 consecutive)
2 wins
Frankie Muniz (2 consecutive)
Joshua Bassett (2 consecutive)

Most nominations

7 nominations 
Tim Allen (2 different roles)

6 nominations
Jace Norman

5 nominations 
Jack Griffo
Jim Parsons
Cole Sprouse

4 nominations 
Joshua Bassett
Caleb McLaughlin
Kirk Cameron
Michael J. Fox (2 different roles)
Grant Gustin
Ross Lynch
Bernie Mac
Frankie Muniz
Will Smith
Dylan Sprouse

3 nominations 
Dylan Gilmer
Drake Bell
Nick Cannon
Drew Carey
Bill Cosby
Benjamin Flores Jr. (2 different roles)
Ashton Kutcher
Martin Lawrence
Jonathan Taylor Thomas

2 nominations
Finn Wolfhard
Iain Armitage
Karan Brar
Jamie Foxx 
Aidan Gallagher 
Joe Jonas
Nick Jonas
Jason Lee
Kel Mitchell
Romeo
Jake Short
Casey Simpson
Kenan Thompson
Tyrel Jackson Williams

References

Favorite Male TV Star